(February 1, 1937 – February 22, 2020) was an international table tennis player from Japan.

Table tennis career
From 1959 to 1961 he won several medals in singles, doubles, and team events in the World Table Tennis Championships and in the Asian Table Tennis Championships.

His four World Championship medals included two gold medals in the doubles with Koji Kimura at the 1961 World Table Tennis Championships and in the team event for Japan in 1959.

See also
 List of table tennis players
 List of World Table Tennis Championships medalists

References

1937 births
2020 deaths
Japanese male table tennis players